Bezirk Gänserndorf is a district of the state of Lower Austria in Austria. The Marchfeld lies in it.

Municipalities

Towns (Städte) are indicated in boldface; market towns (Marktgemeinden) in italics; suburbs, hamlets and other subdivisions of a municipality are indicated in small characters.
Aderklaa
Andlersdorf
Angern an der March
Angern an der March, Grub an der March, Mannersdorf an der March, Ollersdorf, Stillfried
Auersthal
Bad Pirawarth
Bad Pirawarth, Kollnbrunn
Deutsch-Wagram
Drösing
Drösing, Waltersdorf an der March
Dürnkrut
Dürnkrut, Waidendorf
Ebenthal
Eckartsau
Eckartsau, Kopfstetten, Pframa, Wagram an der Donau, Witzelsdorf
Engelhartstetten
Engelhartstetten, Groißenbrunn, Loimersdorf, Markthof, Schloßhof, Stopfenreuth
Gänserndorf
Glinzendorf
Groß-Enzersdorf
Franzensdorf, Groß-Enzersdorf, Matzneusiedl, Mühlleiten, Oberhausen, Probstdorf, Rutzendorf, Schönau an der Donau, Wittau
Groß-Schweinbarth
Großhofen
Haringsee
Fuchsenbigl, Haringsee, Straudorf
Hauskirchen
Hauskirchen, Prinzendorf an der Zaya, Rannersdorf an der Zaya
Hohenau an der March
Hohenruppersdorf
Jedenspeigen
Jedenspeigen, Sierndorf an der March
Lassee
Lassee, Schönfeld im Marchfeld
Leopoldsdorf im Marchfelde
Breitstetten, Leopoldsdorf im Marchfelde
Mannsdorf an der Donau
Marchegg
Breitensee, Marchegg
Markgrafneusiedl
Matzen-Raggendorf
Klein-Harras, Matzen, Raggendorf
Neusiedl an der Zaya
Neusiedl an der Zaya, St. Ulrich
Obersiebenbrunn
Orth an der Donau
Palterndorf-Dobermannsdorf
Dobermannsdorf, Palterndorf
Parbasdorf
Prottes
Raasdorf
Pysdorf, Raasdorf
Ringelsdorf-Niederabsdorf
Niederabsdorf, Ringelsdorf
Schönkirchen-Reyersdorf
Reyersdorf, Schönkirchen
Spannberg
Strasshof an der Nordbahn
Sulz im Weinviertel
Erdpreß, Nexing, Niedersulz, Obersulz
Untersiebenbrunn
Velm-Götzendorf
Götzendorf, Velm
Weiden an der March
Baumgarten an der March, Oberweiden, Zwerndorf
Weikendorf
Dörfles, Stripfing, Tallesbrunn, Weikendorf
Zistersdorf
Blumenthal, Eichhorn, Gaiselberg, Gösting, Großinzersdorf, Loidesthal, Maustrenk, Windisch, Baumgarten, Zistersdorf

References

External links

 
Gaenserndorf
Geography of Lower Austria